is a retired Japanese baseball player for the Hanshin Tigers. He was an All-Star in 1990 and a member of the Tigers' 2003 championship team. In the later years of his career, he was known as the team's "God of Pinch Hitting". After retiring at the end of the 2004 season, he spent some time in the media before becoming a hitting coach for Hanshin in 2009. He was named as the hitting coach for the club's second team for the 2015 season.

References

External links
Career Stats

1965 births
Fresno Suns players
Hanshin Tigers players
Japanese baseball coaches
Japanese expatriate baseball players in the United States
Living people
Nippon Professional Baseball coaches
Nippon Professional Baseball infielders
Baseball people from Okayama Prefecture